Allan "Al" Ford (born August 13, 1950) is a Canadian retired professional boxer. He is a former CBF Lightweight Champion.

Professional boxing career
Ford made his debut as a professional boxer on October 20, 1967 (shortly after his seventeenth birthday), a 3rd round knockout win over Joe Hogue, who was also making his professional debut.  Two months later Ford defeated Ron Lyke by first-round knockout.  Ford fought an opponent with a winning record for the first time in his fifth fight, defeating 4-0 Mickey McMillan by split decision after eight rounds.  Ford would win his first 37 fights, picking up the vacant Canadian lightweight title with a win against 9-1 Julie Mandell and successful defending it several times.  Ford's first truly notable win was a 10-round decision against 30-3-1 Raul Montoya on October 27, 1970.

The first loss of Ford's professional boxing career came against 24-22-5 Percy Hayles in Kingston, Jamaica in a contest for the Commonwealth (British Empire) lightweight title.  Hayles outboxed Ford in a 15 rounder to take the decision.  Ford would continue to fight, winning his next four bouts before back-to-back loses to Ken Buchanan (points) and Alfonso Frazer (knockout).  Later Ford would lose a rematch with Percy Hayles by TKO and would finally lose his Canadian lightweight title to Johnny Summerhays in November 1975.  Ford was still winning more often than he was losing, but he lost to most of his notable opponents, including to 15-4 Ralph Racine, to 15-0 Rick Folstad in 1978, and to 17-0 Aaron Pryor in 1979.  Ford also fought Nick Furlano of Toronto for the Canadian junior welterweight title in 1979, losing by 14th-round knockout.  Near the end losses became more frequent, but Ford's impressive record continued to get him paydays.  He would lose again to Summerhays in 1980 and dropped a decision to 17-0 Ray "Boom Boom" Mancini in 1981. According to witnesses at the time, Ford was involved in long street fight outside an Edmonton nightclub after a dispute around this time.  After losing six of his last seven fights, capped by a brutal decision loss to future prospect Michael Olajide on June 17, 1982, Ford finally retired with a final record of 55-19 with 19 wins coming by knockout.

Personal life
He is the father of retired mixed martial arts fighter and professional boxer Ryan Ford.

Championships and accomplishments
Alberta Sports Hall of Fame
Hall of Fame (Class of 2012)
Canadian Boxing Federation
CBF Lightweight Championship (One time)
Canadian Boxing Hall of Fame
Hall of Fame (Class of 1990)

Professional boxing record

Notes

External links

1950 births
Living people
Lightweight boxers
Welterweight boxers
Light-welterweight boxers
Canadian male boxers
Black Canadian boxers
Sportspeople from Edmonton